Homoranthus prolixus, commonly known as granite homoranthus is a flowering plant in the  family Myrtaceae and is endemic to northern New South Wales. It is a spreading shrub with linear to lance-shaped leaves and groups of up to six yellow to red flowers in the upper leaf axils.

Description
Flowering occurs from September to December and fruits  from September to January.

Taxonomy and naming
Homoranthus prolixus was first formally described in 1991 by Lyndley Craven and S.R.Jones and the description was published in Australian Systematic Botany. The specific epithet (prolixus) is a Latin word meaning "stretched out" or "long".

Distribution and habit
Granite homoranthus grows from Inverell to Bendemeer in northern New South Wales in woodland and heath on shallow sandy soils on and around granite or acid volcanic outcrops.

Conservation status
This homoranthus is considered vulnerable by Briggs and Leigh (1996), but now known to be well reserved and often locally abundant. The Rare or Threatened Australian Plants conservation code of 3RCa is considered more appropriate.

References

External links
 The Australasian Virtual Herbarium – Occurrence data for Homoranthus prolixus

Flora of New South Wales
Myrtales of Australia
prolixus
Plants described in 1991